Urban Design Group (UDG) is a professional architectural, interior, planning and urban design services firm with studios in Atlanta, Georgia, and Dallas, Texas.

Organizational background 
Urban Design Group was founded in 1975, by John M. Novack Jr., after leaving his position as Design Director at C. F. Murphy Associates of Chicago. The organization grew steadily, designing several urban projects, including Rivercenter in San Antonio, Texas; One Tabor Center in Denver, Colorado; Disney's Wilderness Lodge in Orlando, Florida; and Carlson Center in Minnetonka, Minnesota.

Notable projects 

 Amrit Touristic Development, Tartous District, Syria
 Animal Kingdom Lodge, Walt Disney World, Orlando, Florida
 Carlson Center, Minnetonka, Minnesota
 Cameron University Science Complex, Lawton, Oklahoma
 Castle Creek Lodge, Aspen, Colorado
 Convergence Center, Virginia Beach, Virginia
 Denver Dry Goods, Denver, Colorado
 Eagles Nest Ranch, Northeastern, Colorado
 E.M. Dirksen Federal Building: Phase III Renovation, Chicago, Illinois
 Fallen Oak Golf Clubhouse, Gulfport, Mississippi
 Four Winds New Buffalo, New Buffalo, Michigan
 Grand Californian, Disney's California Adventure, Anaheim, California
 Great Platte River Road Archway Monument, Kearney, Nebraska
 Galleria 400, Atlanta, Georgia
 Grand Bear Golf Clubhouse, Gulfport, Mississippi
 Hollywood Slots at Bangor, Maine
 Hollywood Casino at Penn National, Grantville, Pennsylvania
 International Baptist Theological Seminary, Prague, Czech Republic
 Law Offices/Crawford Hill Mansion, Denver, Colorado
 Nakheel Design Summit, Dubai, United Arab Emirates
 OCT Yantian Eco Park and Resort, Shenzhen, China
 One Ten Broadway, San Antonio, Texas
 Opera Galleria, Fort Collins, Colorado
 Quartz Mountain Arts and Conference Center, Lone Wolf, Oklahoma
 Philbrook Museum of Art, Tulsa, Oklahoma
 Preston Ridge I & II, Alpharetta, Georgia
 Rivercenter, San Antonio, Texas
 Silver Legacy, Reno, Nevada
 Sinclair Cabin, Montrose County, Colorado
 Sogang University Graduate School of Business, Seoul, Korea
 Tabor Center, Denver, Colorado
 Tramway Renovation, Denver, Colorado
 Tulsa Community College West Campus Tulsa, Oklahoma
 Tulsa Union Depot (1980), Tulsa, Oklahoma 
 University of Southern California School of Cinematic Arts, Los Angeles, California
 United Artist Theatres, Bugis Junction, Singapore
 United Artist Theatres, Shatin, Hong Kong
 Wilderness Resort, Walt Disney World, Orlando, Florida
 Windward Fairways I and II, Atlanta, Georgia

Gallery

References

Further reading 
iiBaxter, L. (1988) A Sense of Place. Identity.
iiiDivision of Urban Design of the University of Colorado College of Design and Planning, Award of Honor, Tabor Center, 1985.
ivIdeal Places: Rockefeller Visions for America, featuring Tabor Center. 5th Annual Honor Awards.
vGaskie, M. (1989). Just Add Water. Architectural Record, 100.
viJohnson, C. (1983). Tulsa’s Union Depot. Oklahoma Home and Garden. 15.
viiSculley, S.W. (2003). Musing on an ‘American’ Architecture. Urban Design Group: Selected and Current Works, The Master Architect Series, 8.
viiiMorris, D.L. (1996). The Wilderness World of Disney. Log Home Living, 59
xiCommercial and Retail Development (2001). Galleria 400. Georgia Construction Review: Atlanta Edition, 26.
xBruegmann, R. (1989). The Corporate Landscape. Inland Architect. (reprint)

External links 
 

Companies based in Dallas
Architecture firms based in Texas